The "Mississippi Rifles" or the 155th Infantry Regiment, is Mississippi's oldest National Guard unit. Its history predates statehood, back to June 1799, and it is the seventh oldest infantry regiment in the United States Army. They patrolled the frontiers of the Mississippi Territory, captured Aaron Burr, defended Fort Mims during the Indian Wars, and served under General Andrew Jackson in the Battle of New Orleans in the War of 1812.

History
The 155th Infantry is one of only twenty-four currently active Army National Guard units with campaign credits for the War of 1812, and one of only two from a state west of the Appalachians. It has credit for the Florida (1814) and New Orleans Campaigns.

They were known as the "Mississippi Rifles" under the command of Colonel Jefferson Davis in the war with Mexico. They acquired this nickname because the regiment was the first in American history to have an official issue rifle (M1841 Mississippi rifle) instead of a smoothbore musket. It was at the Battle of Buena Vista when other American units began to be overrun by the Mexicans that Col. Davis gave the order, "Stand fast, Mississippians!" The regiment stood their ground and the battle was eventually won.  Davis' order later became the regimental motto.

Instead of the standard US Army uniform, the regiment was outfitted in red shirts, white duck trousers, and black slouch hats. The unit was instrumental in winning the Battle of Monterrey, and mustered for service in the Spanish–American War.

World War I and World War II
The Mississippi Rifles went with General Pershing's "Punitive Expedition" in Mexico and fought against Pancho Villa in 1916. In World War I under the Army's new federalization system, they were designated the 155th Infantry Regiment and served with the 39th Division. In World War II the regiment fought with the 31st Infantry Division in the Pacific Theater. They conducted training for Korea and many members went forward to fight. During the 1950s all but the 1st Battalion were deactivated.

Modern
First Battalion (Combined Arms), 155th Infantry (Mechanized) is now a part of the 155th Heavy Brigade Combat Team (155th HBCT), Mississippi Army National Guard. The unit served in Bosnia as "Task Force Rifles" and in Iraq in 2005–06 and again in 2009–10. The battalion is headquartered in McComb, MS and has infantry companies in Biloxi, MS (A Company), Poplarville, MS (B Company), as well as a Tank company in Kiln, MS (C Company) and a support company (I Company) Brookhaven, MS.

References

External links
 Coat of Arms of the 155th Infantry Regiment {reference only}
 Mississippi Rifles Homepage

Military units and formations of the Mexican–American War
155
Military units and formations established in 1799
United States Army regiments of World War I
1799 establishments in the United States
Infantry regiments of the United States Army National Guard